Epidesmia hypenaria is a moth of the family Geometridae. It is found in Australia.

The wingspan is about 35 mm.

References

Oenochrominae
Moths described in 1857